"Put Your Hand in the Hand" is a gospel pop song composed by Gene MacLellan and first recorded by Canadian singer Anne Murray from her third studio album Honey, Wheat and Laughter.

It became a hit single for the Canadian band Ocean, released as their debut single and title track to their debut album. The song peaked at No. 2 on the U.S. Billboard Hot 100, kept from No. 1 by "Joy to the World" by Three Dog Night. It remained in the top 10 for seven weeks, and was ranked as the No. 33 song for 1971 according to Billboard. The song also reached No. 4 on the Adult Contemporary chart. The band received fan mail for the song from religious figures such as Billy Graham and the Bishop of Toronto.                          

After MacLellan's suicide in 1995, his friend and fellow Atlantic Canadian musician Ron Hynes wrote the song "Godspeed" as a tribute, the lyrics for which reference the title of this song.

The song was inducted into the Canadian Songwriters Hall of Fame in 2006. A remix from the same year adds an instrumental, which occurs between the second chorus and the second verse, as well as a repeat of the chorus and a final instrumentalist chorus, that ends without the fade.

Track listing
7" single

A1 "Put Your Hand in the Hand" – 2:52
A2 "Tear Down the Fences" – 2:53

Chart history

Weekly charts
Ocean

Year-end charts

Alan Garrity

Cover versions
The song was covered in the 1970s by a number of other performers, including Elvis Presley (who also covered MacLellan's "Snowbird"), Randy Stonehill, Larry Norman, Tennessee Ernie Ford, Frankie Laine, Donny Hathaway, Joan Baez, Shirley Caesar, Dutch group Himalaya, the Les Humphries Singers, a German-language version ("Ich fand eine Hand") [I Found a Hand] by Cindy & Bert, a French-language version ("Prends ma main") by Canadian singer Renée Martel, and recorded by Bing Crosby for his 1972 album Bing 'n' Basie. It was also covered, and often sung in concert, by Anita Bryant.

Evangelist Garner Ted Armstrong rendered his take on the song in a January 1976 episode of Hee Haw. Country acts Sandy Posey, Lynn Anderson, Loretta Lynn, and The Oak Ridge Boys also recorded the song.

South African singer Ray Dylan recorded it on his 2009 album Goeie Ou Country - Op Aanvraag.

Later uses
 In a 1991 episode of the sitcom Family Matters titled "Choir Trouble", the cast was singing the song in their church as part of their Gospel Fest. 
 In the 2013 film Prisoners.
 In a 2017 episode of US television series Last Man Standing titled “Take Me to Church”

References

1970 songs
1971 debut singles
Anne Murray songs
Canadian religious songs
Christian songs
Elvis Presley songs
Gospel songs
Joan Baez songs
Ocean (band) songs
Number-one singles in New Zealand
Number-one singles in Norway
Number-one singles in South Africa
Songs written by Gene MacLellan
Kama Sutra Records singles